Ferula hermonis is a species of flowering plant in the Apiaceae family. It is native to Lebanon, Syria and Turkey. The epithet hermonis refers to Mount Hermon on the border between Syria and Lebanon.

Common names include zallouh (Arabic: زلّوع) and Lebanese viagra. The latter name alludes to the traditional use of the roots of this plant as a purported aphrodisiac.

References

External links

Medicinal plants of Asia
Plants described in 1873
harmonis
Taxa named by Pierre Edmond Boissier
Flora of Lebanon